Fort Myers Shores is an unincorporated community and census-designated place (CDP) in Lee County, Florida, United States. The population was 5,774 at the 2020 census. It is part of the Cape Coral-Fort Myers, Florida Metropolitan Statistical Area.

Geography
Fort Myers Shores is located in northeastern Lee County at  (26.712252, -81.737962), on the south side of the Caloosahatchee River. It is bordered to the east by Olga. Florida State Road 80 forms the southern edge of the community, leading east  to LaBelle and southwest  to the center of Fort Myers, the Lee county seat. State Road 31 forms the western edge of the community, leading north  to Arcadia.

Demographics

As of the census of 2000, there were 5,793 people, 2,172 households, and 1,598 families residing in the CDP. The racial makeup of the CDP was 85.98% White, 3.68% African American, 0.64% Native American, 1.52% Asian, 0.07% Pacific Islander, 6.16% from other races, and 1.95% from two or more races. Hispanic or Latino of any race were 17.37% of the population.

There were 2,172 households, out of which 33.0% had children under the age of 18 living with them, 56.8% were married couples living together, 12.9% had a female householder with no husband present, and 26.4% were non-families. 20.5% of all households were made up of individuals, and 7.7% had someone living alone who was 65 years of age or older.  The average household size was 2.67 and the average family size was 3.07.

In the CDP, the population was spread out, with 26.8% under the age of 18, 7.5% from 18 to 24, 26.2% from 25 to 44, 25.4% from 45 to 64, and 14.0% who were 65 years of age or older.  The median age was 38 years. For every 100 females, there were 94.4 males.  For every 100 females age 18 and over, there were 91.0 males.

The median income for a household in the CDP was $37,021, and the median income for a family was $39,757. Males had a median income of $30,510 versus $22,826 for females. The per capita income for the CDP was $20,927.  About 6.6% of families and 8.2% of the population were below the poverty line, including 9.8% of those under age 18 and 5.2% of those age 65 or over.

References

Census-designated places in Lee County, Florida
Census-designated places in Florida